Winds Italia was an Italian aircraft manufacturer based in Bologna that was founded by Canadian hang glider champion pilot Randy Haney. The company specialized in the design and manufacture of paramotors and powered hang glider harnesses in the form of ready-to-fly aircraft for the US FAR 103 Ultralight Vehicles rules and the European microlight category.

The company seems to have been founded about 2001 and gone out of business in 2008, when production of its two models was passed to Flugsport Vetterl GmbH und Co. KG of Schwarzenfeld, Germany.

The company produced the Airwalker paramotor and later the Orbiter series, introduced in 2003 and which replaced the Airwalker in production. The Orbiter offered both the Raket engine and the higher-powered Orbiter XP model with a   Cors'Air M21Y engine.

Aircraft

References

External links
Company website archives on Archive.org
Defunct aircraft manufacturers of Italy
Ultralight aircraft
Powered hang gliders
Paramotors